The Johnsonville Combustion Turbine Plant is a 1.2-gigawatt (1,200 MW), simple cycle natural gas power plant located in New Johnsonville, Tennessee in Humphreys County, Tennessee. It is operated by the Tennessee Valley Authority (TVA).

Background
In 1975 the TVA constructed 16 combustion turbine units at Johnsonville. Four more combustion turbine units were added in 2000. These 20 units have a combined generating capacity of 1.2 gigawatts. With the closure of the Johnsonville Fossil Plant, the TVA added a heat recovery generator to one of the combustion turbine units in 2017 to create the steam needed to produce titanium dioxide at the nearby Chemours plant.

See also
List of power stations in Tennessee

References

External links
Johnsonville Combustion Turbine Plant

Energy infrastructure completed in 1975
Energy infrastructure completed in 2000
Tennessee Valley Authority
Buildings and structures in Humphreys County, Tennessee
Natural gas-fired power stations in Tennessee